Tosny is a former commune in the Eure department in Normandy in northern France, some ten miles south of Rouen. On 1 January 2017, it was merged into the new commune Les Trois Lacs.

Population

Personalities
René Riffaud

See also
Communes of the Eure department

References

Former communes of Eure